Jamaican English, including Jamaican Standard English, is a variety of English native to Jamaica and is the official language of the country. A distinction exists between Jamaican English and Jamaican Patois (or Creole), though not entirely a sharp distinction so much as a gradual continuum between two extremes. Jamaican English tends to follow British English spelling conventions.

Sociolinguistics
Jamaican Standard English is a type of International Standard English (English language in England). There are several language varieties that have significantly impacted this dialect of English. English was introduced into Jamaica in 1655, because of the colonisation by Britain. British English was spread through post-primary education, and through British teachers that immigrated to Jamaica. Standard English in Jamaica conflated with the British Standard. Individuals who speak the standard variety are often considered to be of a higher social class. Also, American English has   contributed to the Jamaican English dialect. These impacts can be traced to the development of stronger social and economic ties with the United States, the popularity of U.S. cultural offerings, including film, music, and televised dramas and comedies and tourism. Jamaican Patois is another source of influence on Jamaican English. Many rural homes are mono lingually Patois.

Grammar
Despite Jamaican Standard English being conflated with the British Standard Dialect, there are great similarities between grammar, idiom, and vocabulary.

Phonology

Non-rhoticity (the pronunciation of "r" nowhere except before vowels) is highly variable in Jamaican English and can depend upon the phonemic and even social context. When "r" is followed by a consonant, non-rhoticity is more likely than when "r" is not followed by a consonant. However, overall more rhoticity is positively correlated with higher levels of education. This has been attributed to the Jamaican education system normalising and promoting a rhotic variety of English. Thus, the overall degree of rhoticity in educated Jamaican English remains very low, with rhoticity occurring  21.7% of the time.

Merger of the diphthongs in "fair" and "fear" takes place both in Jamaican Standard English and Jamaican Patois, resulting in those two words (and many others, like "bear" and "beer") often becoming homophones: the sound being , though often  (something like "ee-air"; thus "bear/beer" as "bee-air").

Both  and  use a rounded , though a cot-caught merger is theoretically avoided by the latter set of words being more lengthened; however, in reality, a full merger (of ) is reportedly increasing in informal contexts.

Before the low central vowel , the velars  and  can be realized with palatalisation, so that cat can be pronounced [khat ~ kjat] and card as [kha:d ~ kja:d]); while [ɡ] and [ɡj] coexist, as in gap [ɡap ~ ɡjap] or guard [ɡa:(ɹ)d ~ ɡja:(ɹ)d]. These variations are distinct phonemes in Jamaican Patois before [a]: [ɡja:dn̩] is garden while [ɡa:dn̩] is Gordon; [kja:f] is calf while [ka:f] is cough. They are not distinct phonemes in Jamaica English because these word pairs are distinguished by the vowel ([a] vs [ɔ]) instead. However, this fact hasn't stopped educated speakers from incorporating [kj] in their English at least before unlengthened "a".

Th-stopping is also common.

One of the most salient sounds of Caribbean English to speakers of outside English dialects is its unique rhythm and intonation. Linguists debate whether this system centres mostly on stress, tone, or a mixture in which the two interact.

Language use: Jamaican Standard English versus Patois

Jamaican Standard English and Jamaican Patois exist together in a post-creole speech continuum. Jamaican (Creole/Patois) is used by most people for everyday, informal situations - it is the language most Jamaicans use at home and are most familiar with, as well as the language of most local popular music. Jamaican Patois has begun to be used on the radio as well as the news. Standard English, on the other hand, is the language of education, high culture, government, the media and official/formal communications. It is also the native language of a small minority of Jamaicans (typically upper-class and upper/traditional middle-class). Most Creole-dominant speakers have a fair command of English and Standard English, through schooling and exposure to official culture and mass media; their receptive skills (understanding of Standard English) are typically much better than their productive skills (their own intended Standard English statements often show signs of Jamaican Creole interference).

Most writing in Jamaica is done in English (including private notes and correspondence). Jamaican Patois has a standardised orthography as well, but has only recently been taught in some schools, so the majority of Jamaicans can read and write Standard English only, and have trouble deciphering written Patois (in which the writer tries to reflect characteristic structures and pronunciations to differing degrees, without compromising readability). Written Patois appears mostly in literature, especially in folkloristic "dialect poems"; in humoristic newspaper columns; and most recently, on internet chat sites frequented by younger Jamaicans, who seem to have a more positive attitude toward their own language use than their parents.

While, for the sake of simplicity, it is customary to describe Jamaican speech in terms of Standard English versus Jamaican Creole, a clear-cut dichotomy does not describe the actual language use of most Jamaicans. Between the two extremes—"broad Patois" on one end of the spectrum, and "perfect" Standard English on the other—there are various in-between varieties. This situation typically results when a Creole language is in constant contact with Standardised English (superstrate or lexifier language) and is called a creole speech continuum. The least prestigious (most Creole) variety is called the basilect; Standard English (or high prestige) variety, the acrolect; and in-between versions are known as mesolects.

Consider, for example, the following forms:

"im/(h)ihn de/da/a wok úoba désò" (basilect)
"im workin ova deso" (low mesolect)
"(H)e (h)is workin' over dere" (high mesolect)
"He is working over there." (acrolect)

(As noted above, the "r" in "over" is not pronounced in any variety, but the one in "dere" or "there" is.)

Jamaicans choose from the varieties available to them according to the situation. A Creole-dominant speaker will choose a higher variety for formal occasions like official business or a wedding speech, and a lower one for relating to friends; a Standard English-dominant speaker is likely to employ a lower variety when shopping at the market than at their workplace. Code-switching can also be metacommunicative (as when a Standard-dominant speaker switches to a more heavily basilect-influenced variety in an attempt at humor or to express solidarity).

See also
 Regional accents of English speakers
 Nation language

References

 

Caribbean English
Dialects of English
Jamaican culture
English